Lee Kenneth Smethills (born 30 March 1982 in Bolton, Greater Manchester) is a former professional motorcycle speedway rider from England.

Career

Smethills rode for various clubs across all of the three divisions of British Speedway from 1998 until 2009. His final full season was the 2008 Premier League speedway season, where he rode for the Sheffield Tigers although he did ride a handful of matches during the 2009 National League speedway season for Buxton Hitmen and Weymouth Wildcats respectively and in 2010 for Plymouth Devils and the Isle of Wight Islanders.

References

Living people
1982 births
British speedway riders
Berwick Bandits riders
Exeter Falcons riders
Glasgow Tigers riders
Hull Vikings riders
Newcastle Diamonds riders
Plymouth Devils riders
Sheffield Tigers riders
Workington Comets riders
People from Bolton